William Jones (1745–1818) was an English naturalist and entomologist.

Jones was a wealthy wine merchant in London. His interest in natural history led to his being elected a Fellow of the Linnean Society of London in 1791.  He died in Chelsea, London.

He is best known for Jones Icones 1,500 watercolours of butterflies and some moths which is conserved in Oxford University Museum of Natural History. It was never published. Jones Icones illustrates specimens from the collections of Dru Drury, Joseph Banks and John Francillon as well as a few from the British Museum and Linnean Society collections. Portions of Jones' own collection was illustrated by Elisabeth Denyer in a manuscript she later donated to the British Library.

References

1745 births
1818 deaths
People from Chelsea, London
English naturalists
English lepidopterists
Wine merchants
18th-century English businesspeople